Stephen Miller (born August 23, 1985) is an American political advisor who served as a senior advisor for policy and White House director of speechwriting to President Donald Trump. His politics have been described as far-right and anti-immigration. He was previously the communications director for then-Senator Jeff Sessions. He was also a press secretary for U.S. representatives Michele Bachmann and John Shadegg.

As a speechwriter for Trump, Miller helped write Trump's inaugural address. He has been a key adviser since the early days of Trump's presidency. An immigration hardliner, Miller was a chief architect of Trump's travel ban, the administration's reduction of refugees accepted to the United States, and Trump's policy of separating migrant children from their parents. He prevented the publication of internal administration studies that showed that refugees had a net positive effect on government revenues. Miller reportedly played a central role in the resignation in April 2019 of Secretary of Homeland Security Kirstjen Nielsen, who he believed was insufficiently hawkish on immigration.

As a White House spokesman, Miller on multiple occasions made false and unsubstantiated claims regarding widespread electoral fraud. Emails leaked in November 2019 showed that Miller had promoted articles from white nationalist publications VDARE and American Renaissance, and had espoused conspiracy theories. Miller is on the Southern Poverty Law Center's list of extremists.

Early life
Miller was born on August 23, 1985, in Santa Monica, California, where he was raised, the second of three children in the Jewish family of Michael D. Miller, a real estate investor, and Miriam (née Glosser). His mother's ancestors—Wolf Lieb Glotzer and his wife, Bessie—emigrated to the United States from the Russian Empire's Antopol, in what is present-day Belarus, arriving in New York on January 7, 1903, on the German ship S.S. Moltke, thus escaping the 1903–06 anti-Jewish pogroms in Belarus and other parts of the Russian Empire. When his great-grandmother arrived in the U.S. in 1906, she spoke only Yiddish, the historical language of the Ashkenazi Jews of Eastern Europe.

Miller has said he became a committed conservative after reading Guns, Crime, and Freedom, a book opposing gun control by Wayne LaPierre, CEO of the National Rifle Association. While attending Santa Monica High School, Miller began appearing on conservative talk radio. In 2002, at the age of 16, Miller wrote a letter to the editor of the Santa Monica Outlook criticizing his school's response to the September 11 attacks; he wrote: "Osama Bin Laden would feel very welcome at Santa Monica High School." While in high school, Miller cited Rush Limbaugh's book The Way Things Ought To Be as his favorite. Miller invited conservative activist David Horowitz to speak, first at the high school and later at Duke University; afterward he denounced the fact that neither institution would authorize the event. Miller was in the habit of "riling up his fellow [high school] classmates with controversial statements"; for instance, he told Latino students to speak only English.

At 16, Miller called in to The Larry Elder Show, a conservative radio show, to complain about his high school's alleged lack of patriotism because it did not recite the Pledge of Allegiance. David Horowitz, whom the Southern Poverty Law Center describes as an anti-Muslim, anti-immigrant extremist, published an essay by Miller, "How I Changed My Left-Wing High School", on his website. Horowitz has been described as an influential figure in Miller's early life.

In 2007, Miller received his bachelor's degree from Duke University, where he studied political science. He served as president of the Duke chapter of Horowitz's Students for Academic Freedom and wrote conservative columns for the school newspaper. Miller gained national attention for his defense of the students who were wrongly accused of rape in the Duke lacrosse case. While attending Duke, Miller accused poet and civil rights activist Maya Angelou of "racial paranoia" and described student organization Chicano Student Movement of Aztlán (MEChA) as a "radical national Hispanic group that believes in racial superiority."

Miller and the Duke Conservative Union helped co-member Richard Spencer, a Duke graduate student at the time, with fundraising and promotion for an immigration policy debate in March 2007 between Peter Laufer, an open-borders activist and University of Oregon professor, and journalist Peter Brimelow, founder of the anti-immigration website VDARE. Spencer later became an important figure in the white supremacist movement and president of the National Policy Institute; he coined the term "alt-right". In a 2016 interview, Spencer said he had mentored Miller at Duke. Describing their close relationship, Spencer said that he was "kind of glad no one's talked about this", for fear of harming Trump. In a later blog post, he said the relationship had been exaggerated. Miller has said he has "absolutely no relationship with Mr. Spencer" and that he "completely repudiate[s] his views, and his claims are 100 percent false."

Duke University's former senior vice president, John Burness, told The News & Observer in February 2017 that, while at Duke, Miller "seemed to assume that if you were in disagreement with him, there was something malevolent or stupid about your thinking—incredibly intolerant." According to Jane Stancill of The News & Observer, during the Duke lacrosse case, Miller's was the "lonely voice insisting that the players were innocent." History professor KC Johnson described Duke's atmosphere during the case as not "conducive to speaking up" and praised Miller's role in it: "I think it did take a lot of courage, and he has to get credit for that." Miller devoted more of his school paper column, "Miller Time," to the lacrosse scandal than any other topic.

Career
After graduating from college, Miller began to work as a press secretary for Congresswoman Michele Bachmann, a Tea Party Republican, after David Horowitz connected them. Horowitz later helped Miller to get a position with John Shadegg in early 2009. In 2009, Miller began working for Alabama senator Jeff Sessions, who was later appointed United States attorney general. He rose to the position of Sessions' communications director. In the 113th Congress, Miller played a role in defeating the bipartisan Gang of Eight's proposed immigration reform bill. As communications director, Miller was responsible for writing many of the speeches Sessions gave about the bill. Miller and Sessions developed what Miller describes as "nation-state populism", a response to globalization and immigration that influenced Donald Trump's 2016 campaign. Miller also worked on Dave Brat's successful 2014 House campaign, which unseated Republican majority leader Eric Cantor.

In January 2016, Miller joined the Donald Trump 2016 presidential campaign as a senior policy adviser. He had previously reached out to the campaign repeatedly. Beginning in March 2016, he regularly spoke on the campaign's behalf, serving as a "warm-up act" for Trump. Miller wrote the speech Trump gave at the 2016 Republican National Convention. In August 2016, Miller was named the head of Trump's economic policy team.

Miller was seen as sharing an "ideological kinship" with former White House chief strategist and Breitbart News co-founder Steve Bannon, and had a "long collaboration" with him. However, Miller distanced himself from Bannon in 2017 as Bannon fell out of favor with others in the White House.

On April 7, 2021, Miller launched the America First Legal Foundation, a conservative legal organization.

On September 8, 2022, Miller and Brian Jack were subpoenaed by a federal grand jury investigating attempts to overturn the 2020 United States presidential election with special focus on the January 6 United States Capitol attack.

Trump administration
In November 2016, Miller was named national policy director of Trump's transition team. On December 13, 2016, the transition team announced that Miller would serve as Senior Advisor to the President for Policy during the Trump administration. He was initially given responsibility for setting all domestic policy, but quickly assumed responsibility for immigration policy only. Since becoming one of three Senior Advisors to the President, Miller has been regarded as the adviser who shaped the Trump administration's immigration policies.

In the early days of Trump's presidency, Miller worked with Senator Jeff Sessions, Trump's nominee for Attorney General, and Steve Bannon, Trump's chief strategist, to enact policies through executive orders to restrict immigration and crack down on sanctuary cities. Miller and Bannon preferred executive orders to legislation. Miller's and Sessions's views on immigration were influenced by anti-immigration groups like the Federation for American Immigration Reform, NumbersUSA, and the Center for Immigration Studies. Miller and Bannon were involved in the formation of Executive Order 13769, which sought to restrict U.S. travel and immigration by citizens of seven Muslim countries, and suspend the United States Refugee Admissions Program (USRAP) for 120 days, while indefinitely suspending entry of Syrians to the United States. Miller has been credited as the person behind the Trump administration's decision to reduce the number of refugees accepted into the United States.

Miller played an influential role in Trump's decision to fire FBI director James Comey in May 2017. Miller and Trump drafted a letter to Comey that was not sent after an internal review and opposition from White House counsel Don McGahn, but Deputy Attorney General Rod Rosenstein was given a copy, after which he prepared his own letter to Comey, which was cited as the reason for firing Comey. In November 2017, Miller was interviewed by special counsel Robert Mueller in relation to his role in Comey's dismissal.

In September 2017, The New York Times reported that Miller stopped the Trump administration from showing the public an internal study by the Department of Health and Human Services that found that refugees had a net positive effect on government revenues. Miller insisted that only the costs of refugees be publicized, not the revenues refugees bring in.

In October 2017, Trump provided a list of immigration reform demands to Congress, asking for the construction of more wall along the Mexico–United States border, hiring 10,000 additional U.S. Immigration and Customs Enforcement agents, tightened asylum policies, and the discontinuance of federal funds to sanctuary cities in exchange for any action on undocumented immigrants who arrived as minors. Those immigrants had been protected from deportation under the Deferred Action for Childhood Arrivals policy until that policy's rescission a month earlier, in September 2017. The New York Times reported that Miller and Sessions were among the Trump Administration officials who developed the demands.

In May 2018, it was reported Miller had attended a controversial meeting which included George Nader on behalf of two Arab princes, Wikistrat CEO Joel Zamel, Erik Prince, and Donald Trump Jr., on August 3, 2016. The New York Times had also reported in November 2017 that Miller was in regular contact with George Papadopoulos during the campaign about his discussions with Russian government officials.

Miller and Attorney General Sessions were described as the chief champions of the Trump administration's decision to start to separate migrant children from their parents when they crossed the U.S. border. Miller argued that such a policy would deter migrants from coming to the United States. After Miller gave an on-the-record interview to the Times, the White House requested that the Times not publish portions of it on its podcast, The Daily; the Times acceded to the request.

In July 2018, senior White House official Jennifer Arangio was fired after she reportedly advocated that the United States remain in the Global Compact for Migration (a United Nations plan intended to "cover all dimensions of international migration in a holistic and comprehensive manner."), defended the State Department's refugee bureau when Miller sought to defund it, and corrected misleading information about refugees that Miller was presenting to Trump.

On August 13, 2018, Politico published an essay by Miller's uncle, Dr. David S. Glosser, titled "Stephen Miller Is an Immigration Hypocrite. I Know Because I'm His Uncle", in which he detailed the Glosser family's history of coming to the United States from the village of Antopal in present-day Belarus.

In October 2018, the Financial Times reported that Miller sought to make it impossible for Chinese students to study in the United States. Miller argued that a ban was necessary to reduce Chinese espionage, but that another benefit was that it would hurt elite universities with staff and students critical of Trump. Within the Trump administration, Miller's idea faced opposition, in particular from Terry Branstad, the ambassador to China, who argued that such a ban would harm US trade to China and hurt small American universities more than the elite ones.

In the lead-up to the 2018 midterm elections, Miller played an influential role in Trump's messaging, which focused on sowing fears about immigration. Trump's party lost 40 seats in the House in those elections, in part because, according to Vox writer Dara Lind, Trump and Miller's "closing argument" focusing on immigrants appealed solely to "white identity politics", which does not have majority support in the United States.

In January 2019, Miller reportedly reduced the number of immigrants who would receive protections as part of a proposed offer by Trump to grant protections for some immigrants in exchange for congressional support for funds to construct a border wall.

Miller reportedly played a central role in Secretary of Homeland Security Kirstjen Nielsen's resignation on April 7, 2019, as part of a larger department overhaul aimed at steering the Trump administration towards a "tougher" approach on immigration. Nielsen had opposed a plan Miller supported whereby the Trump administration would carry out mass arrests of undocumented immigrant families in 10 major U.S. cities. Quartz reported that Miller had been purposely leaking information on border apprehensions and asylum seekers to the Washington Examiner so that the paper would publish alarming anti-immigration stories that criticized Nielsen. During the same month, Representative Ilhan Omar called Miller a white nationalist as part of her comments on the Department of Homeland Security overhaul, which led to a strong response from several Republicans, including Representative Lee Zeldin and Donald Trump Jr., who accused her of anti-Semitism as Miller is Jewish. Following the exposé by the Southern Poverty Law Center in November 2019, Omar reshared the April tweet in which she had called Miller a white nationalist, adding that "now we have the emails to prove it".

In the wake of the United States' assassination of Abu Bakr al-Baghdadi, Miller allegedly suggested "dipping [al-Baghdadi's head] in pig's blood and parading it around to warn other terrorists", according to former defense secretary Mark Esper in his 2022 book A Sacred Oath. Esper called Miller's idea a "war crime"; Miller denied that this took place.

While in the Trump administration, Miller met repeatedly with British Foreign Secretary Boris Johnson, whom Miller described himself as a "huge fan" of. During the meetings, which were held off the White House grounds, Miller and Johnson "swapped speech-writing ideas and tips".

In 2020, during the coronavirus pandemic, leaked conversations showed that Miller wanted to extend temporary border restrictions imposed because of the pandemic to restrict immigration in the long term. Emails showed that Miller had tried to use public health powers to implement border restrictions in 2019. Miller also advised Trump not to openly embrace mask-wearing to halt the spread of the coronavirus. 

According to The New York Times, in the spring of 2020 Miller requested that the Homeland Security Department develop a plan to use American troops to seal the entire U.S. border with Mexico. Government officials estimated that such a plan would require the deployment of approximately 250,000 troops, or more than half of the active army, constituting the largest use of American military force within the country since the Civil War. Defense Secretary Mark Esper reportedly opposed the plan and it was eventually abandoned. 

During the 2020 election, Miller said that if Trump were reelected, the administration would seek to limit asylum, target sanctuary city policies, expand the "travel ban" and cut work visas. He voiced support for the administration's third-country "Asylum Cooperative" agreements with Central American governments, among other policies, and pledged that it would pursue such policies with African and Asian countries if reelected.

After Trump lost the 2020 election and failed to get the result overturned in courts or state legislatures, on December 14 Miller described on television a plan to send "alternate" slates of electors to Congress. That day, as the official electoral college votes were being tallied, groups of self-appointed Republican "alternate electors" met in seven swing states and drafted fraudulent certificates of ascertainment. Since these alternate slates were not signed by the governors or secretaries of state of the states they claim to represent, they had no legal status, but could have been introduced as challenges to the true results when Congress counted the electoral votes on January 6, 2021. The watchdog group American Oversight published the documents in March 2021, but they received little attention until January 2022, when it was reported that the January 6 committee was investigating them. Michigan attorney general Dana Nessel announced in January 2022 that after a months-long investigation she had asked the U.S. Justice Department to open a criminal investigation. 

On January 6, Trump held a rally to support his false claim that the 2020 election had been stolen. Miller prepared the remarks that Trump delivered at the rally. During and after the speech, many of the attendees walked to the U.S. Capitol and stormed it.

Leaked emails
In November 2019, the Southern Poverty Law Center acquired more than 900 emails Miller sent Breitbart News writer Katie McHugh between 2015 and 2016. The emails became the basis for an exposé that showed that Miller had enthusiastically pushed the views of white nationalist publications such as American Renaissance and VDARE, as well as the far-right conspiracy website InfoWars, and promoted The Camp of the Saints, a French novel circulating among neo-Nazis, shaping both White House policy and Breitbarts coverage of racial politics. In response to the exposé, White House press secretary Stephanie Grisham called the SPLC an "utterly discredited, long-debunked far-left smear organization." As of November 15, 2019, over 80 Democratic members of Congress have called for Miller's resignation in light of his emails. On November 13, Representative Alexandria Ocasio-Cortez (D-New York) started a petition that had reached more than 20,000 signatures by November 16. According to The Daily Beast, seven "senior Trump administration officials with knowledge of Miller's standing with the president and top staffers have all individually told The Daily Beast that the story did not endanger Miller's position, or change Trump's favorable view of him. Two of them literally laughed at the mere suggestion that the Hatewatch exposé could have toppled or hobbled the top Trump adviser."

Media appearances
On February 8, 2016, Miller participated in an interview with InfoWars, during which he praised the site and its owner, Alex Jones, for its coverage of immigration and the Trans-Pacific Partnership.

In a February 2017 appearance on CBS' Face the Nation, Miller criticized the federal courts for blocking Trump's travel ban, accusing the judiciary of having "taken far too much power and become, in many cases, a supreme branch of government ... Our opponents, the media and the whole world will soon see as we begin to take further actions, that the powers of the president to protect our country are very substantial and will not be questioned." Miller's assertion was met with criticism from legal experts, such as Ilya Shapiro of the Cato Institute (who said that the administration's comments could undercut public confidence in the judiciary) and Cornell Law School professor Jens David Ohlin (who said that the statement showed "an absurd lack of appreciation for the separation of powers" set forth in the Constitution). In the same appearance, Miller falsely said there was significant voter fraud in the 2016 presidential election and that "thousands of illegal voters were bused in" to New Hampshire. Miller did not provide any evidence in support of the statements; The Washington Posts Glenn Kessler found that Miller has on multiple occasions made false or unsubstantiated claims regarding electoral fraud.

On January 7, 2018, Miller appeared on Jake Tapper's State of the Union on CNN. In the course of Tapper's interview of him, Miller called Steve Bannon's comments about the Trump Tower meeting in Michael Wolff's book Fire and Fury "grotesque". Miller then went on to state, "The president is a political genius... who took down the Bush dynasty, who took down the Clinton dynasty, who took down the entire media complex". Tapper accused Miller of dodging questions, while Miller questioned the legitimacy of CNN as a news broadcaster, and as the interview became more contentious, with both participants talking over each other, Tapper ended the interview and continued to the next news story. After the interview was over Miller refused to leave the CNN studio and had to be escorted out by security.

In February 2019, as a controversy arose from a declaration of national emergency by Trump in order to fund building a wall along the southern border with Mexico that had been denied by Congress, Miller defended the declaration during a televised interview by Chris Wallace.

Debate with Jim Acosta
On August 2, 2017, Miller had a heated exchange with CNN's Jim Acosta at the White House daily briefing regarding the Trump administration's support for the RAISE Act to sharply limit legal immigration and favor immigrants with high English proficiency. Acosta said that the proposal was at odds with American traditions concerning immigration and said that the Statue of Liberty welcomes immigrants to the U.S., invoking verses from Emma Lazarus's "The New Colossus". Miller disputed the connection between the Statue of Liberty and immigration, pointing out that "the poem that you're referring to, that was added later, is not actually a part of the original Statue of Liberty." Miller added that immigration has "ebbed and flowed" throughout American history and asked how many immigrants the U.S. had to accept annually to "meet Jim Acosta's definition of the Statue of Liberty law of the land."

In their coverage, multiple publications (such as The Washington Post, Washington Monthly and U.S. News & World Report) commented that the distinction Miller made between the Statue of Liberty and Lazarus's poem has been a popular talking point among the white supremacist segments of the alt-right. The Posts Michelle Ye Hee Lee stated that "Neither got it quite right about the Statue of Liberty ... While the poem itself was not a part of the original statue, it actually was commissioned in 1883 to help raise funds for the pedestal" and "gave another layer of meaning to the statue beyond its abolitionist message."

Personal life 
Miller married Katie Waldman, a fellow administration official, on February 16, 2020. They have a daughter, born November 19, 2020, and announced the birth of their son in February 2022. Miller is Jewish.

He announced on October 6, 2020, that he had tested positive for COVID-19. He was among several White House employees affected by an outbreak.

References

External links

 

|-

|-

1985 births
21st-century American non-fiction writers
American conspiracy theorists
American male non-fiction writers
American people of Belarusian-Jewish descent
American political writers
American speechwriters
Anti-immigration politics in the United States
California Republicans
Donald Trump 2016 presidential campaign
Duke University Trinity College of Arts and Sciences alumni
Far-right politics in the United States
Jewish American writers
Living people
People associated with the 2016 United States presidential election
Senior Advisors to the President of the United States
Trump administration personnel
United States congressional aides
White House Directors of Speechwriting
21st-century American male writers
People from Santa Monica, California